The Presbyterian Church in Korea (HanGukBoSu) is a Reformed denomination in South Korea. It affirms the Apostles Creed and the Westminster Confession. In 2004 the church had 6,900 members in 132 congregations, the government is Presbyterian.

References 
http://usaptayo.org/

Presbyterian denominations in South Korea
Presbyterian denominations in Asia